Turbonilla dispar is a species of sea snail, a marine gastropod mollusk in the family Pyramidellidae, the pyrams and their allies.

Description
The shell grows to a length between 4 mm and 9.5 mm.

Distribution
This species occurs in the Atlantic Ocean off Brazil, Uruguay ad Argentina at depths between 5 m and 65 m.

References

External links
 To Biodiversity Heritage Library (2 publications)
 To Encyclopedia of Life
 To World Register of Marine Species
 

dispar
Gastropods described in 1897